Saleh Rozati (Persian: صالح روضاتی , born August 17, 1982) is an Iranian artist, photographer, stage designer, performing artist, and musician based in Austria.

Biography 
He was born on August 17, 1982, in Isfahan, Iran. Rozati graduated MA from Academy of Fine Arts Vienna.

He got Sony World Photography Awards 2015 in People Category.

Exhibitions 

 2017 – Austrian Days in Gdańsk-Gdynia 
 2015 – Sony World Foto Award 2015, Sumerset house, London
 2010 –  Preview of the past
 2008 – The First Annual Detroit .gif Group Show – Stockholm

Awards 

 1st Place, Sony World PhotographyAwards, People Category
 1st Place, "Lichtfarben" international photography competition 2009

References

External links 

 
 Official website

Portrait photographers
Fine art photographers
Set designers
Iranian photographers
1982 births
Living people